A batman or an orderly is a soldier or airman assigned to a commissioned officer as a personal servant. Before the advent of motorized transport, an officer's batman was also in charge of the officer's "bat-horse" that carried the officer's kit during a campaign.

The British English term is derived from the obsolete bat, meaning "pack saddle" (from French bât, from Old French bast, from Late Latin bastum)

The military term long predates the appearance of the fictional superhero Batman.

Duties 
A batman's duties often include:

 acting as a "runner" to convey orders from the officer to subordinates
 maintaining the officer's uniform and personal equipment as a valet
 driving the officer's vehicle, sometimes under combat conditions
 acting as the officer's bodyguard in combat
 digging the officer's foxhole in combat, giving the officer time to direct his unit
 other miscellaneous tasks the officer does not have time or inclination to do

The action of serving as a batman was referred to as "batting". In armies where officers typically came from the upper class, it was not unusual for a former batman to follow the officer into later civilian life as a domestic servant.

By country

France 

In the French Army the term for batman was ordonnance ("orderly"). Batmen were officially abolished after World War II. However, in the 1960s there were still batmen in the French Army.

Germany 
In the German Army the batman was known as Ordonnanz ("orderly") from the French "ordonnance", or colloquially as Putzer ("cleaner") or as Bursche ("boy" or "valet").

The main character Švejk of the antimilitarist, satirical novel The Good Soldier Švejk by the Czech author Jaroslav Hašek is the most famous portrayal of a batman drafted into the Austro-Hungarian Army during the First World War. (The 1967 German song "Ich war der Putzer vom Kaiser" is actually based on the British instrumental hit "I Was Kaiser Bill's Batman" of the same year, with original German lyrics.)

India 
The old British term "orderly" continued into the post-independence Indian Army. It has now, however, been replaced with the Hindi word sahayak, which translates as "assistant" or "helper". There have been suggestions to do away with the practice, as the Indian Navy and Indian Air Force already have.

Bangladesh  
In Bangladesh Army, officers and officer cadets have civilian orderlies. In Bangladesh Air Force, they are called batmen.

Italy 
In the Italian Army the term for batman was attendente, from the Italian verb attendere (same meaning of the English verb to attend). Attendenti were eventually abolished in 1971.

Nigeria 
The term Orderly is in use for both the military and police assistants.

Pakistan 
The term "batman" in the Pakistan Army dates from the period of the British Indian Army. In the modern Pakistan Army, civilian personnel are employed in this role and are designated as NCB (Non-Combatant Bearer) or (Non-Commissioned Batman). The term implies that the present-day batman is not a soldier or part of the fighting cadre of the army, and works only as a personal servant to each officer.

The employment of NCBs in the Pakistan Air Force and the Pakistan Navy is not officially recognized. However both these services pay their officers an extra allowance comparable to the average pay of a household servant.

Russia and the Soviet Union 

The Imperial Russian Army used the term denshchik for a batman. In the Russian Empire higher-ranking cavalry officers often chose Cossacks for these roles as they could be reasonably depended on to survive combat, and were also known for resourcefulness on campaign. However, they were hired help, and had to be provided with a horse also. The lower-ranking officers from serf-owning families brought a servant from home they were familiar with, particularly the infantry and artillery officers that did not require additional protection in combat, and tended to leave the servants with the unit baggage train. After the abolition of serfdom in the Russian Empire (1861), many officers went on campaign without servants.

Although the positions were abolished in the post-revolutionary Soviet Union, the recognition that higher-ranking officers required assistance soon fostered an unofficial reintroduction of the role through secondment of an NCO to the officer's staff, usually also as the driver, which also at one stage became their unofficial role and title as many officers often "lived" out of their vehicles. The term was borrowed from the French, but adopted to Russian pronunciation as ordinarets.

Several ordirnartsy of the marshals and generals commanding fronts and armies during the Second World War wrote memoirs about their service. For example, Zhukov's "driver" was a semi-professional racing car driver Aleksandr Nikolaevich Buchin who met Zhukov by accident on the first day of the war when Zhukov's previous elderly driver failed to get the vehicle he was in out of the rut. Buchin drove Zhukov throughout the war and although he began the war as a private, he ended the war with the rank of captain. Buchin wrote his memoirs called One hundred and seventy thousand kilometres with Zhukov, at the suggestion of the marshal in the 1970s.

Sweden 
Kalfaktor, derived from calefactory and entering the Swedish language during the 17th century, was a soldier assigned to tend to an officer from the rank of platoon leader and higher. The duties was mainly focused on practicalities like maintaining the officer's personal equipment and uniform, make sure meals and sleeping quarters are prepared and so forth, but also to remind the officer to get rest when needed and to avoid unnecessary risks.

Turkey 
The term "emir eri" (literally "order private") was used for a soldier that attends an officer. The practice was abolished in 1950.

United Kingdom 
The official term used by the British Army in the First World War was "soldier-servant". Every officer was assigned a servant, usually chosen by the officer from among his men. The term batman replaced this in the inter-war years. Batmen were among the casualties of the Great Depression, and by the Second World War only senior officers of the army and Royal Air Force were officially assigned batmen, with junior officers usually sharing the services of one batman among several officers. Batwomen also served in the women's services.

Batman was usually seen as a desirable position. The soldier was exempted from more onerous duties and often got better rations and other favours from his officer. Senior officers' batmen usually received fast promotion to lance-corporal, with many becoming corporals and even sergeants. The position was generally phased out after the war. Officers of the Household Division however still have orderlies, because of the high proportion of ceremonial duties required of them.

In the Royal Navy, stewards performed many of the duties of batmen in the other services. Aboard ship, only captains and admirals were assigned personal stewards, with the other officers being served by a pool of officers' stewards. Most vessels carried at least two stewards, with larger vessels carrying considerably more.

The Royal Marines used the term Marine Officer's Attendant (MOA).

The term "orderly" was often used instead of "batman" in the colonial forces, especially in the British Indian Army. The orderly was frequently a civilian instead of a soldier. However, from 1903 to 1939 four Indian officers from different regiments were appointed each year to serve as "King's (or Queen's) Indian Orderly Officers" in attendance on the monarch in London. While performing some routine orderly functions the main role of these officers was to represent the Indian Army in full dress uniform at ceremonial functions in front of the British public who might otherwise seldom be made aware of its existence.

In the British Armed Forces, the term "batman" or "batwoman" was formerly also applied to a civilian who cleaned officers' messes or married quarters. In the Royal Air Force, free married quarters cleaning services were phased out for all officers except squadron leaders or above in command appointments as of 1 April 1972.

One famous example of officer and batman during the Second World War was British actor David Niven and fellow actor Peter Ustinov. Niven and Ustinov were working on the film The Way Ahead, as actor and writer respectively, but the difference in their ranks—Niven was a Lieutenant-Colonel and Ustinov a private—made their association militarily impossible; to solve the problem, Ustinov was appointed as Niven's batman.

At the start of the Battle of Gazala in the Second World War, Major General Frank Messervy was captured by the Germans on 27 May 1942, but having removed all insignia, managed to bluff the Germans into believing he was a batman. As such, he was not closely guarded by his captors and managed to escape with other members of his staff to rejoin Division HQ the following day.

United States 
Aides are junior commissioned officers who are available to support some of the needs of general officers who serve in command positions in the rank of brigadier general and above, and those of Flag Officers in the grade of Rear Admiral (lower half) and above in the Navy and Coast Guard. These aides "perform tasks and details that, if performed by general or flag officers, would be at the expense of the officer’s primary military and official duties." Their assistance, however, is restricted to those tasks which are directly related to the officer's official duties.

In addition to officers being assigned as aides de camp, all the US Services, including the US Coast Guard, also use enlisted personnel in support of General Officers and Flag Officers. This program is officially known as the Enlisted Aide Program. Generally the personnel are military cooks however in recent years, any enlisted person could volunteer to serve in this position. They attend a joint service course for Enlisted Aides and advanced culinary course for cooks. Many are often sent on to education outside the military to become chefs and butler training. Some will also be used as stewards and stewardess on very senior officer aircraft. In addition General and Flag officers are assigned a driver. Drivers may get additional training but not always in driving, taking their service's or another service's driver course and or other government agency's driving schools. Only personnel in the Enlisted Aide Program can serve as an Enlisted Aide. Drivers, admin personnel and others on the personal staff are often but not always selected locally.

Ordinarily, enlisted service members would be prohibited from performing services as an aide. "No officer may use an enlisted member as a servant for duties that contribute only to the officer's personal benefit and that have no reasonable connection with the officer's official responsibilities, according to the Department of Defense instruction 1315.09 for Enlisted Aides.

In the United States Army the term "striker" or "dog robber" (a slang term implying that the soldier ate table scraps otherwise given to the officer's pet dog) was unofficially used, although that could also be applied to a junior officer who acted as a gofer to somebody with high rank. The actor James Garner played such a role in the film The Americanization of Emily (1964).

Fiction 

In Dorothy L. Sayers's novel Whose Body? (1923) and subsequent novels, Lord Peter Wimsey's valet Mervyn Bunter was also his batman during World War I. Bunter is said to have helped rescue Lord Peter after he was buried alive when shell fire collapsed a dugout he was in and was credited with saving his life on several occasions both during and after the war. Bunter was also instrumental in helping his master recover from and cope with what was then called "shell shock" (post traumatic stress disorder) upon his return to civilian life. Bunter taught himself photography in order to assist His Lordship in his detective activities.

In the novella Goodbye, Mr. Chips (1933), Mr. Chipping's former student, Peter Colley, is killed during the Great War attempting to save the life of his batman and childhood antagonist-cum-friend, Perkins.

Jaroslav Hašek's Good Soldier Švejk begins his WWI military career as a batman to army chaplain Otto Katz; Katz loses him at cards to Senior Lieutenant Lukáš, whose batman he then becomes.

In DC Comics media, Alfred Pennyworth (Batman's butler, created in 1943) has been referred to multiple times as "Batman's batman." Currently unsubstantiated rumors have it that Alfred was also Thomas Wayne's (Bruce Wayne's late father) batman when both men were in military service.

In the Eagle comic strip Dan Dare (first published in 1950), Digby is Dan's batman.

J. R. R. Tolkien took the relationship of his characters Samwise Gamgee and Frodo Baggins (introduced in The Fellowship of the Ring in 1954) from his observations while in military service during World War I of the relationship between a batman and his officer.

In 1967, the pseudonymous Whistling Jack Smith (actually a session vocalist) recorded an all-whistling number called "I Was Kaiser Bill's Batman", which went Top 5 in the UK. Despite a title that baffled most Americans (who no doubt were thinking of the other Batman), the tune hit number 20 on the Billboard charts.

In the musical film Chitty Chitty Bang Bang (1968), Caractacus Potts's father was Lord Scrumptious's batman.

In the BBC sitcom Blackadder Goes Forth (1989), set during World War I, actor Tony Robinson portrays Private S. Baldrick, the bumbling and incompetent batman to Captain Edmund Blackadder. In the earlier series, taking place between the 1400s and the early 1800s, he plays Edmund Blackadder's dogsbody Baldrick, a similar, non-military role.

In the Honor Bound book series (1993–2012), the character of Sergeant Major Enrico Rodriguez served in this capacity to Cletus Frade's father.
In the television show Archer (created in 2009), the eponymous character's valet, Woodhouse, was the batman of his superior officer in the Royal Flying Corps in the First World War.

In the television series Downton Abbey (2010–2015), Lord Grantham's valet, Mr Bates, was his batman in the Boer War; it also appears that William Mason was assigned to be Matthew Crawley's batman in the First World War.

In the television series 
Blunt Talk (2015–2016), Adrian Scarborough played Harry Chandler, Falklands War veteran and former Royal Marines lance corporal turned Walter's valet.

In the 2012 novel Cold Days by Jim Butcher, the lead character, Harry Dresden is assigned a batman, and initially both Harry and Cat Sith are very unhappy with this assignment.

In Terry Pratchett's 2013 novel Monstrous Regiment, the main character serves as batman to her lieutenant.

Frank Herbert’s 1984 novel Heretics of Dune, Patrin, the aide of Miles Teg, is referred to as the Bashar’s Batman.

In the Hungarian movie Taxidermia (2006) Vendel Morosgoványi serves as a batman condemned to performing menial duties for the officer and his family while sleeping in an unheated shack next to the latrines. He frequently escapes into fantasy. So realistic are these fantasies that in one ambiguous instance, Morosgoványi sleeps with and impregnates the lieutenant's wife and "wakes up" to find himself engaged in an act of sodomy with a slaughtered pig.

See also
 Aide-de-camp (ADC)
 Adjutant
 Bagman
 Equerry
 Squire
 Valet

References

External links 

 

Military life
Personal care and service occupations